Narcotization may mean:

 Narcotics, administration of narcotic drugs
 Narcotizing dysfunction, a theory about the social consequence of mass media